The Jerusalem Academy of Medicine was established in 1957, with the stated goal of promoting the medical science, providing facilities for post graduate students and research, and serving as a center for advancing the medical practice and public health in Israel.

See also
 Israel Medical Association

References

Medical associations based in Israel